The MOWAG Roland is an armored personnel carrier of Swiss origin. The vehicle was developed in 1960 and the prototype was tested in 1963. The Roland production was from 1964 to 1980.

Design 
The Roland was designed for a variety of tasks: ambulance, reconnaissance, armored troop carriers, riot /protests control and as rocket launcher.

There is a searchlight mounted on the front, directly behind it is a rotary roof section for a machine gun (MG) or a tower for a heavy machine gun MG, which is operated by the commander. The engine is in the rear, on the left side of the vehicle. On the right side, in the rear and on the left side of the vehicle are doors fitted for the vehicle occupants to enter or exit.

Some African operators have their MOWAG Roland equipped with multiple rocket launchers for 5 unguided rockets.  MOWAG Roland vehicles for police units typically do not have a gun, but are equipped with a siren, blue light, searchlight, loud speakers and a V-shaped dozer blade.

Variants 
 Versions: armoured ambulance, standard Army APC, riot and crowd control vehicle, SANDF variant with rockets
 Armament: Customer Specific assault rifle or machine gun like cal.50 HMG or a cal.30 Browning, or M60, GMPG light machine guns

Operators 
Over 500 Mowag Rolands were produced and shipped to countries like Argentina, Bolivia, Chile, Greece (army and police), Mexico, Peru and in various Police Departments in Switzerland.

On display 
The Schweizerisches Militärmuseum Full has a display of a Roland MOWAG from the Bern Cantonal Police. This model is exhibited with a plow attached and was in use until 1997.

See also

Comparable vehicles 
 Berliet VXB-170
 BRDM-1
 BRDM-2
 Cadillac Gage Commando
 Condor (APC)
 Fiat 6614
 FUG / OT-65
 Mowag MR 8
 MOWAG Piranha 4x4 IB
 Mowag Spy
 Panhard M3

References

Notes

Bibliography

External links 

Wheeled armoured fighting vehicles
Armoured fighting vehicles of Switzerland
Military vehicles of Switzerland
Military vehicles introduced in the 1960s
Wheeled armoured personnel carriers
Armoured personnel carriers of the Cold War